The Romani Holocaust or the Romani genocide—also known as the Porajmos (Romani pronunciation: , meaning "the Devouring"), the Pharrajimos meaning the hard times ("Cutting up", "Fragmentation", "Destruction"), and the Samudaripen ("Mass killing")—was the effort by Nazi Germany and its World War II allies and collaborators to commit ethnic cleansing and eventually genocide against Europe's Romani people (including the Sinti) during the Holocaust era.

Under Adolf Hitler, a supplementary decree to the Nuremberg Laws was issued on 26 November 1935, classifying the Romani as "enemies of the race-based state", thereby placing them in the same category as the Jews. Thus, the fate of the Roma in Europe paralleled that of the Jews in the Holocaust.

Historians estimate that between 250,000 and 500,000 Romani and Sinti were killed by Germans and their collaborators—25% to over 50% of the estimate of slightly fewer than 1 million Roma in Europe at the time. Later research cited by Ian Hancock estimated the death toll to be at about 1.5 million out of an estimated 2 million Roma.

In 1982, West Germany formally recognized that Germany had committed genocide against the Romani. In 2011, Poland officially adopted 2 August as a day of commemoration of the Romani genocide.

Within the Nazi state, first persecution, then extermination, was aimed primarily at sedentary "Gypsy mongrels". In December 1942, Heinrich Himmler ordered the deportation of all Roma from the Greater Germanic Reich, and most were sent to the specially established Gypsy camp at Auschwitz-Birkenau. Other Roma were deported there from the occupied Western European territories. Approximately 21,000 of the 23,000 Roma and Sinti sent there did not survive. In areas outside the reach of systematic registration, e.g., in the German-occupied areas of Eastern and Southeastern Europe, the Roma who were most threatened were those who, in the German judgment, were "vagabonds", though some were actually refugees or displaced persons. Here, they were killed mainly in massacres by German military and police formations as well as SS task forces, and in armed resistance against Nazi occupation.

Etymology 
The term porajmos (also porrajmos or pharrajimos—literally, "devouring" or "destruction" in some dialects of the Romani language) was introduced by Ian Hancock, in the early 1990s. Hancock chose the term, coined by a Kalderash Rom, from a number of suggestions in an "informal conversation in 1993".

The term is mostly used by activists and as a result, its usage is unknown to most Roma, including relatives of victims and survivors. Some Russian and Balkan Romani activists protest against the use of the word porajmos. In various dialects, porajmos is synonymous with poravipe which means "violation" and "rape", a term which some Roma consider offensive. János Bársony and Ágnes Daróczi, pioneering organisers of the Romani civil rights movement in Hungary, prefer the term Pharrajimos, a Romani word meaning "cutting up", "fragmentation", "destruction". They argue against using porrajmos, saying it is marhime (unclean, untouchable): "[p]orrajmos is unpronounceable in the Roma community, and thus is incapable of conveying the sufferings of the Roma".

Balkan Romani activists prefer the term samudaripen ("mass killing"), first introduced by linguist Marcel Courthiade in the 1970s in Yugoslavia in the context of Auschwitz and Jasenovac. It is a neologism of sa (Romani for 'all') and mudaripen (murder). It can be translated as 'murder of all' or 'mass murder'. International Romani Union now use this term. Ian Hancock dismisses this word, arguing that it does not conform to Romani language morphology. Some Ruska Roma activists offer to use the term Kali Traš ("Black Fear"). Another alternative that has been used is Berša Bibahtale ("The Unhappy Years"). Lastly, adapted borrowings such as Holokosto, Holokausto, etc. are also used in the Romani language on some occasions.

Linguistically, the term porajmos is composed of the verb root porrav- and the abstract-forming nominal ending -imos. This ending is of the Vlax Romani dialect, whereas other varieties generally use -ibe(n) or -ipe(n). For the verb itself, the most commonly given meaning is "to open/stretch wide" or "to rip open", whereas the meaning "to open up the mouth, devour" occurs in fewer varieties.

History

Anti-Romani discrimination before 1933

Emergence of scientific racism 
In the late 19th century, the emergence of scientific racism and Social Darwinism, linking social differences with racial differences, provided the German public with pseudoscientific justifications for prejudices against Jews and Roma. During this period, "the concept of race was systematically employed in order to explain social phenomena." This approach attempted to validate the belief that races were not variations of a single species of man because they had distinctly different biological origins. It established a purportedly scientifically-based racial hierarchy, which defined certain minority groups as the other on the basis of biology.

In addition to racial pseudoscience, the end of the 19th century was a period of state-sponsored modernization in Germany. Industrial development altered many aspects of society. Most notably, the period shifted the social norms of work and life. For the Roma, this meant the denial of their traditional way of life as craftsmen and artisans. János Bársony notes that "industrial development devalued their services as craftsmen, resulting in the disintegration of their communities and social marginalization."

Persecution by the German Empire and the Weimar Republic 
The developments of racial pseudoscience and modernization resulted in anti-Romani state interventions, carried out by both the German Empire and the Weimar Republic. In 1899, the Imperial Police Headquarters in Munich established the Information Services on Romani by the Security Police. Its purpose was to keep records (identification cards, fingerprints, photographs, etc.) and continuous surveillance on the Roma community. Roma in the Weimar Republic were forbidden from entering public swimming pools, parks, and other recreational areas, and depicted throughout Germany and Europe as criminals and spies.

The 1926 "Law for the Fight Against Gypsies, Vagrants and the Workshy" was enforced in Bavaria, becoming the national norm by 1929. It stipulated that groups identifying as 'Gypsies' avoid all travel to the region. Those already living in the area were to "be kept under control so that there [was] no longer anything to fear from them with regard to safety in the land." They were forbidden from "roam[ing] about or camp[ing] in bands", and those "unable to prove regular employment" risked being sent to forced labor for up to two years.
Herbet Heuss notes that "[t]his Bavarian law became the model for other German states and even for neighbouring countries."

The demand for Roma to give up their nomadic ways and settle in a specific region was often the focus of anti-Romani policy both of the German Empire and the Weimar Republic. Once settled, communities were concentrated and isolated in one area within a town or city. This process facilitated state-run surveillance practices and 'crime prevention.'

Following the passage of the Law for the Fight Against Gypsies, Vagrants, and the Workshy, public policy increasingly targeted the Roma on the explicit basis of race. In 1927, Prussia passed a law that required all Roma to carry identity cards. Eight thousand Roma were processed this way and subjected to mandatory fingerprinting and photographing. Two years later, the focus became more explicit. In 1929, the German state of Hessen proposed the "Law for the Fight Against the Gypsy Menace". The same year the Centre for the Fight Against Gypsies in Germany was opened. This body enforced restrictions on travel for undocumented Roma and "allowed for the arbitrary arrest and detention of gypsies as a means of crime prevention."

Aryan racial purity 

For centuries, Romani tribes had been subject to antiziganist persecution and humiliation in Europe. They were stigmatized as habitual criminals, social misfits, and vagabonds. When Hitler came to national power in 1933, anti-Gypsy laws in Germany remained in effect. Under the "Law against Dangerous Habitual Criminals" of November 1933, the police arrested many Roma with others the Nazis viewed as "asocial"—prostitutes, beggars, homeless vagrants, and alcoholics—and imprisoned them in internment camps.

After Hitler's rise to power, legislation against the Romani was increasingly based upon a rhetoric of racism. Policy originally based on the premise of "fighting crime" was redirected to "fighting a people". Targeted groups were no longer determined by juridical grounds. Instead, they were victims of racialized policy.

The Department of Racial Hygiene and Population Biology began to experiment on Romani to determine criteria for their racial classification.

The Nazis established the Racial Hygiene and Demographic Biology Research Unit (Rassenhygienische und Bevölkerungsbiologische Forschungsstelle, Department L3 of the Reich Department of Health) in 1936. Headed by Robert Ritter and his assistant Eva Justin, this Unit was mandated to conduct an in-depth study of the "Gypsy question (Zigeunerfrage)" and to provide data required for formulating a new Reich "Gypsy law". After extensive fieldwork in the spring of 1936, consisting of interviews and medical examinations to determine the racial classification of the Roma, the Unit decided that most Romani, whom they had concluded were not of "pure Gypsy blood", posed a danger to German racial purity and should be deported or eliminated. No decision was made regarding the remainder (about 10 percent of the total Romani population of Europe), primarily Sinti and Lalleri tribes living in Germany. Several suggestions were made. Reichsführer-SS Heinrich Himmler suggested deporting the Romani to a remote reservation, as had been done by the United States for its Native Americans, where "pure Gypsies" could continue their nomadic lifestyle unhindered. According to him:

Himmler took special interest into the "Aryan" origins of the Romani and distinguished between "settled" (assimilated) and "unsettled" Romani. In May 1942 an order was issued according to which all "Gypsies" living in the Balkans were to be arrested. 

Although the Nazi regime never produced the "Gypsy Law" desired by Himmler, policies and decrees were passed which discriminated against the Romani people. Roma were classified as "asocial" and "criminals" by the Nazi regime. From 1933 on, Roma were placed in concentration camps. After 1937, the Nazis started to carry out racial examinations on the Roma living in Germany. In 1938, Himmler issued an order regarding the 'Gypsy question' which explicitly mentioned "race" which stated that it was "advisable to deal with the Gypsy question on the basis of race." The decree made it law to register all Roma (including Mischlinge – mixed race), as well as those people who "travel around in a Gypsy fashion" over the age of six. Although the Nazis believed that the Roma were originally Aryan, over time they were said to have become mixed race and were classified as "non-Aryan" and of an "alien race".

Loss of citizenship 

The Nuremberg race laws were passed on 15 September 1935. The first Nuremberg Law, the "Law for the Protection of German Blood and Honor", forbade marriage and extramarital intercourse between Jews and Germans. The second Nuremberg law, "The Reich Citizenship Law", stripped Jews of their German citizenship. On 26 November 1935, Germany expanded the Nuremberg laws to also apply to the Roma. Romani, like Jews, lost their right to vote on 7 March 1936.

Persecution and genocide 

The Third Reich's government began persecuting the Romani as early as 1936 when they started to transfer the people to municipal internment camps on the outskirts of cities, a prelude to their deportation to concentration camps. A December 1937 decree on "crime prevention" provided the pretext for major roundups of Roma. Nine representatives of the Romani community in Germany were asked to compile lists of "pure-blooded" Romanis to be saved from deportation. However, the Germans often ignored these lists, and some individuals identified on them were still sent to concentration camps. Notable internment and concentration camps include Dachau, Dieselstrasse, Marzahn (which evolved from a municipal internment camp) and Vennhausen.

Initially, the Romani were herded into so-called ghettos, including the Warsaw Ghetto (April–June 1942), where they formed a distinct class in relation to the Jews. Ghetto diarist Emmanuel Ringelblum speculated that Romani were sent to the Warsaw Ghetto because the Germans wanted:... to toss into the Ghetto everything that is characteristically dirty, shabby, bizarre, of which one ought to be frightened, and which anyway has to be destroyed.

Initially, there was disagreement within the Nazi circles about how to solve the "Gypsy Question". In late 1939 and early 1940, Hans Frank, the General Governor of occupied Poland, refused to accept the 30,000 German and Austrian Roma which were to be deported to his territory. Heinrich Himmler "lobbied to save a handful of pure-blooded Roma", whom he believed to be an ancient Aryan people for his "ethnic reservation", but was opposed by Martin Bormann, who favored deportation for all Roma. The debate ended in 1942 when Himmler signed the order to begin the mass deportations of Roma to Auschwitz concentration camp. During Operation Reinhard (1941–43), an undetermined number of Roma were killed in the extermination camps, such as Treblinka.

The Nazi persecution of Roma was not regionally consistent. In France, between 3,000 and 6,000 Roma were deported to German concentration camps as Dachau, Ravensbrück, Buchenwald, and other camps. Further east, in the Balkan states and the Soviet Union, the Einsatzgruppen, mobile killing squads, travelled from village to village massacring the inhabitants where they lived and typically leaving few to no records of the number of Roma killed in this way. In a few cases, significant documentary evidence of mass murder was generated. Timothy Snyder notes that in the Soviet Union alone there were 8,000 documented cases of Roma murdered by the Einsatzgruppen in their sweep east.

In return for immunity from prosecution for war crimes, Erich von dem Bach-Zelewski stated at the Einsatzgruppen Trial that "the principal task of the Einsatzgruppen of the S.D. was the annihilation of the Jews, Gypsies, and Political commissars". Roma in the Slovak Republic were killed by local collaborating auxiliaries. Notably, in Denmark and Greece, local populations did not participate in the hunt for Roma as they did elsewhere. Bulgaria and Finland, although allies of Germany, did not cooperate with the Porajmos, just as they did not cooperate with the Jewish Shoah.

On 16 December 1942, Himmler ordered that the Romani candidates for extermination should be transferred from ghettos to the extermination facilities of Auschwitz-Birkenau. On 15 November 1943, Himmler ordered that Romani and "part-Romanies" were to be put "on the same level as Jews and placed in concentration camps". The camp authorities housed Roma in a special compound that was called the "Gypsy family camp". Some 23,000 Roma, Sinti, and Lalleri were deported to Auschwitz altogether. In concentration camps such as Auschwitz, Roma wore brown or black triangular patches, the symbol for "asocials", or green ones, the symbol for professional criminals, and less frequently the letter "Z" (meaning Zigeuner, German word for gypsy).

Sybil Milton, a scholar of Nazi Germany and the Holocaust, has speculated that Hitler was involved in the decision to deport all Romani to Auschwitz, as Himmler gave the order six days after meeting with Hitler. For that meeting, Himmler had prepared a report on the subject Führer: Aufstellung wer sind Zigeuner. On some occasions, the Roma attempted to resist the Nazis' extermination. In May 1944 at Auschwitz, SS guards tried to liquidate the Gypsy Family Camp and were "met with unexpected resistance". When ordered to come out, they refused, having been warned and arming themselves with crude weapons: iron pipes, shovels and other tools. The SS chose not to confront the Roma directly and withdrew for several months. After transferring as many as 3,000 Roma who were capable of forced labor to Auschwitz I and other concentration camps, the SS moved against the remaining 2,898 inmates on 2 August. The SS killed nearly all of the remaining inmates, most of them ill, elderly men, women and children, in the gas chambers of Birkenau. At least 19,000 of the 23,000 Roma sent to Auschwitz died there.

The Society for Threatened Peoples estimates the Romani deaths at 277,100. Martin Gilbert estimates that a total of more than 220,000 of the 700,000 Romani in Europe were killed, including 15,000 (mainly from the Soviet Union) in Mauthausen in January–May 1945. The United States Holocaust Memorial Museum cites scholars who estimate the number of Sinti and Roma killed as between 220,000 and 500,000. Sybil Milton estimated the number of lives lost as "something between a half-million and a million-and-a-half".

Persecution in other Axis countries and occupied countries 
Romani were also persecuted by the puppet regimes that cooperated with the Third Reich during the war, especially the notorious Ustaše regime in the Independent State of Croatia. Tens of thousands of Romani were killed in the Jasenovac concentration camp, along with Serbs, Jews, and anti-fascist Muslims and Croats. Yad Vashem estimates that the Porajmos was most intense in Yugoslavia, where around 90,000 Romani were killed. The Ustaše government virtually annihilated the country's Romani population, killing an estimated 25,000 and also deporting around 26,000.

In May 1942 an Ustaše order was issued, according to stop the deportation of Muslim Roma residing in Bosnia and Herzegovina.

In the Territory of the Military Commander in Serbia, the German occupiers and Serbian collaborationist puppet government Government of National Salvation killed thousands of Romani in the Banjica concentration camp, Crveni Krst concentration camp and Topovske Šupe concentration camp along with Jews. In August 1942 Harald Turner reported to his superiors that "Serbia is the only country in which the Jewish question and the Gypsy question have been solved."

Serbian Romani were parties to the unsuccessful class action suit against the Vatican Bank and others in the U.S. federal court in which they sought the return of wartime loot.

The governments of some Nazi German allies, namely Slovakia, Finland, Italy, Vichy France, Hungary, and Romania, also contributed to the Nazi plan of Romani extermination, but most Romani in these countries survived, unlike those in Ustaše Croatia or areas directly ruled by Nazi Germany (such as occupied Poland). The Hungarian Arrow Cross government deported between 28,000 and 33,000 Romani out of a population that was estimated to be between 70,000 and 100,000.

The Romanian government of Ion Antonescu did not systematically annihilate Roma on its territory. Some resident Roma were deported to the occupied Transnistria. Of the estimated 25,000 Romani inmates of these camps, 11,000 (44%, or almost half) died. (See also the research of Michelle Kelso, presented in her film, Hidden Sorrows, based upon research amongst the survivors and in archives.)

In Fascist Italy, as well as in Slovenia and Montenegro under Italian occupation, the majority of Roma were forcibly rounded up into camps, although they were generally relatively well treated, especially in contrast to the parts of Europe occupied by Nazi Germany. Many of them were deported to Sardinia, with much of them being given Italian identity cards that put them out of reach of extermination by the Nazis and Ustaše. As a result, the vast majority of Roma in Italy and its occupied territories managed to survive the war.

According to eyewitness Mrs. de Wiek, Anne Frank, a notable Jewish Holocaust victim, is recorded as having witnessed the prelude to the murder of Romani children at Auschwitz: "I can still see her standing at the door and looking down the camp street as a herd of naked gypsy girls were driven by, to the crematory, and Anne watched them going and cried."

In the Protectorate of Bohemia and Moravia, Romani internees were sent to the Lety and Hodonín concentration camps before being transferred to Auschwitz-Birkenau for gassing. What makes the Lety camp unique is that it was staffed by Czech guards, who could be even more brutal than the Germans, as testified in Paul Polansky's book Black Silence. The genocide was so thorough that the vast majority of Romani in the Czech Republic today are actually descended from migrants from Slovakia who moved there during the post-war years in Czechoslovakia. In Nazi-occupied France, between 16,000 and 18,000 were killed.

The small Romani population in Denmark was not subjected to mass killings by the Nazi occupiers; instead, it was simply classified as "asocial". Angus Fraser attributes this to "doubts over ethnic demarcations within the travelling population". The Romanis of Greece were taken hostage and prepared for deportation to Auschwitz, but they were saved by appeals from the Archbishop of Athens and the Greek Prime Minister.

In 1934, 68 Romani, most of them Norwegian citizens, were denied entry into Norway, and they were also denied transit through Sweden and Denmark when they wanted to leave Germany. In the winter of 1943–1944, 66 members of the Josef, Karoli, and Modis families were interned in Belgium and deported to the gypsy department in Auschwitz. Only four members of this group survived.

Estimated number of victims 
The following figures are from The Columbia Guide to the Holocaust and the United States Holocaust Memorial Museum's online encyclopedia of the Holocaust.

However new findings and documents uncovered by research experts revealed that the Roma death toll was at least about 200,000 to 500,000 of the 1 or 2 million Roma in Europe, although there are numerous experts and scholars who give much higher number of Romani deaths, such as Ian Hancock, director of the Romani Archives and Documentation Center at the University of Texas at Austin, in his findings discovered that almost the entire Romani population was killed in Croatia, Estonia, Lithuania, Luxembourg, and the Netherlands. Rudolph Rummel, the late professor emeritus of political science at the University of Hawaii who spent his career assembling data on collective violence by governments toward their people (for which he coined the term democide), estimated that 258,000 must have been killed in Europe, 36,000 in Romania under Ion Antonescu and 27,000 in Ustaše-controlled Croatia.

In a 2010 publication, Ian Hancock stated that he agrees with the view that the number of Romanies killed has been underestimated as a result of being grouped with others in Nazi records under headings such as "remainder to be liquidated", "hangers-on", and "partisans". He notes recent evidence such as the previously obscure Lety concentration camp in the Czech Republic and Ackovic's revised estimates of Romani killed by the Ustaše as high as 80,000–100,000. These numbers suggest that previous estimates have been grossly underrepresented.

Zbigniew Brzezinski has estimated that 800,000 Roma people died as a result of Nazi actions.

Medical experiments 

Another distinctive feature of both the Porajmos and the Holocaust was the extensive use of human subjects in medical experiments. The most notorious of these physicians was Josef Mengele, who worked in the Auschwitz concentration camp. His experiments included placing subjects in pressure chambers, testing drugs on them, freezing them, attempting to change their eye color by injecting chemicals into children's eyes and various amputations and other brutal surgeries. The full extent of his work will never be known because the truckload of records he sent to Otmar von Verschuer at the Kaiser Wilhelm Institute was destroyed by von Verschuer. Mengele's own journals, consisting of some 3,300 pages, are likely never to be published. Subjects who survived Mengele's experiments were almost always killed and dissected shortly afterwards. One Roma survivor of medical experimentation was Margarethe Kraus.

Mengele seemed particularly keen on working with Romani children. He brought them sweets and toys and personally took them to the gas chamber. They called him "Onkel Mengele". Vera Alexander was a Jewish inmate at Auschwitz who looked after 50 sets of Romani twins:

I remember one set of twins in particular: Guido and Ina, aged about four. One day, Mengele took them away. When they returned, they were in a terrible state: they had been sewn together, back to back, like Siamese twins. Their wounds were infected and oozing pus. They screamed day and night. Then their parents—I remember the mother's name was Stella—managed to get some morphine and they killed the children in order to end their suffering.

Recognition and remembrance 

The German government paid war reparations to Jewish survivors of the Holocaust, but not to the Romani. There were "never any consultations at Nuremberg or any other international conference as to whether the Sinti and Roma were entitled like the Jews to reparations." The Interior Ministry of Wuerttemberg argued that "Gypsies [were] persecuted under the Nazis not for any racial reason but because of an asocial and criminal record". When on trial for his leadership of Einsatzgruppen in the USSR, Otto Ohlendorf cited the massacres of Roma people during the Thirty Years War as a historical precedent.

In the historiography of East Germany (GDR), the persecution of Sinti and Roma under National Socialism was largely taboo. The German historian Anne-Kathleen Tillack-Graf states that in the GDR, Sinti and Roma were not mentioned as concentration camp prisoners during the official commemorations of the liberation at the three national memorial sites Buchenwald, Sachsenhausen, and Ravensbrück, just like homosexuals, Jehovah's Witnesses and asocial detainees. West Germany recognised the genocide of the Roma in 1982, and since then the Porajmos has been increasingly recognized as a genocide committed simultaneously with the Shoah. The American historian Sybil Milton wrote several articles arguing that the Porajmos deserved recognition as part of the Holocaust. In Switzerland, a committee of experts investigated the policy of the Swiss government during the Porajmos.

Formal recognition and commemoration of the Roma persecution by the Nazis have been difficult in practical terms due to the lack of significant collective memory and documentation of the Porajmos among the Roma. This results from both of their tradition of oral history and illiteracy, heightened by widespread poverty and continuing discrimination that has forced some Roma out of state schools. One UNESCO report of Roma in Romania showed that only 40% of Roma children are enrolled in primary school, compared to the national average of 93%. Of those enrolled, only 30% of Roma children go on to complete primary school. In a 2011 investigation of the state of the Roma in Europe today, Ben Judah, a Policy Fellow with the European Council on Foreign Relations, traveled to Romania.

Nico Fortuna, a sociologist and Roma activist, explained the distinction between Jewish collective memory of the Shoah and the Roma experience:

Ian Hancock has also observed a reluctance among Roma to acknowledge their victimization by the Third Reich. The Roma "are traditionally not disposed to keeping alive the terrible memories from their history—nostalgia is a luxury for others". The effects of the illiteracy, the lack of social institutions, and the rampant discrimination faced by Roma in Europe today have produced a people who, according to Fortuna, lack a "national consciousness ... and historical memory of the Holocaust because there is no Roma elite."

Acts of commemoration 

The first memorial commemorating victims of the Romani Holocaust was erected on 8 May 1956, in the Polish village of Szczurowa commemorating the Szczurowa massacre. Since 1996, a Gypsy Caravan Memorial has been traveling among the main remembrance sites in Poland, from Tarnów via Auschwitz, Szczurowa and Borzęcin Dolny, gathering the Romani and well-wishers in the remembrance of the Porajmos. Several museums dedicate a part of their permanent exhibition to documenting that history, such as the Museum of Romani Culture in Czech Republic and the Ethnographic Museum in Tarnów in Poland. Some political organisations have tried to block the installation of Romani memorials near former concentration camps, as shown by the debate over Lety and Hodonin in the Czech Republic.

On 23 October 2007, President Traian Băsescu publicly apologized for his nation's role in the Porajmos, the first time a Romanian leader has done so. He called for the Porajmos to be taught in schools, stating that, "We must tell our children that six decades ago children like them were sent by the Romanian state to die of hunger and cold". Part of his apology was expressed in the Romani language. Băsescu awarded three Porajmos survivors with an Order for Faithful Services. Before recognizing Romania's role in the Porajmos, Traian Băsescu was widely quoted after an incident on 19 May 2007, in which he insulted a journalist by calling her a "stinky gypsy". The president subsequently apologized.

On 27 January 2011, Zoni Weisz became the first Roma guest of honour at Germany's official Holocaust Memorial Day ceremony. Dutch-born Weisz escaped death during a Nazi round-up when a policeman allowed him to escape. Nazi injustices against the Roma were recalled at the ceremony, including that directed at Sinto boxer Johann Trollmann.

In July 2011 the Polish Parliament passed a resolution for the official recognition of 2 August as a day of commemoration of the genocide.

On 5 May 2012 the world premiere of the Requiem for Auschwitz, by composer Roger Moreno Rathgeb, was performed at the Nieuwe Kerk in Amsterdam by The Roma and Sinti Philharmoniker directed by Riccardo M Sahiti. The Philharmoniker is a pan-European orchestra of Roma and Sinto musicians generally employed by other classical orchestras; it is focused on the contribution of Roma culture to classical music. Dutch-Swiss Sinto Moreno Rathgeb wrote his requiem for all victims of Auschwitz and Nazi terror. The occasion of the premiere was coupled to a conference, Roma between Past and Future. The requiem has since been performed in Tilburg, Prague, Budapest, Frankfurt, Cracow, and Berlin.

On 24 October 2012 the Memorial to the Sinti and Roma Victims of National Socialism was unveiled in Berlin. Since 2010, ternYpe – International Roma Youth Network has organized a commemoration week called "Dikh he na bister" (look and don't forget) about 2 August in Kraków and Auschwitz-Birkenau. In 2014 they organised the largest Youth Commemoration Ceremony in history, attracting more than 1000 young Roma and non-Roma from 25 countries. This initiative of ternYpe Network was held under the European Parliament's High Patronage granted by President Martin Schulz.

In popular culture 
In the 2011 documentary film, A People Uncounted: The Untold Story of the Roma, filmmaker Aaron Yeger chronicles the rich, yet difficult history of the Roma people, from ancient times to the Romani genocide during WWII by the Nazis and then present day. Romani Holocaust survivors share their raw, authentic stories of life at the concentration camps, providing first-hand accounts of this minority group's experience that remains largely unknown to the public.
In 2009, Tony Gatlif, a French Romani film director, directed the film Korkoro, which portrays the Romani Taloche's escape from the Nazis, with help from a French notary, Justes, and his difficulty in trying to lead a sedentary life. The film's other main character, Mademoiselle Lise Lundi, is inspired by Yvette Lundy, a teacher who worked in Gionges and was active in the French Resistance.
The 1988 Polish film, And the Violins Stopped Playing, also has Porajmos as its subject. It was criticized for showing the killing of Roma as a method of removing witnesses to the killing of Jews.
A scene in the French-language film Train de Vie (Train of Life), directed by Radu Mihaileanu, depicts a group of Romani singing and dancing with Jews at a stop en route to a concentration camp.
In X-Men's graphic novel The Magneto Testament, Max Eisenhardt, who would later become Magneto, has a crush on a Romani girl called Magda. He later meets her again in Auschwitz, where she is in the Gypsy Camp and together, they plan their escape. The Porajmos is described in detail.
In 2019, Roz Mortimer directed The Deathless Woman, a 'hybrid-documentary' film which is both a ghost story and a record of first person testimony about historical crimes against the Roma in WWII (and contemporary ones). The ghostly narrator, voiced by Iveta Kokyová in Romani, questions the absence of her history in archives and museums.

See also 

History of the Romani people
Anti-Romani sentiment
Auschwitz concentration camp
Nazi crimes against the Polish nation
Holocaust
Szczurowa massacre
Roma people in Europe
Rescue of Roma during the Porajmos
Roma Holocaust Memorial Day

References 
Notes

Bibliography

 
 

 

 
 
 
  Note: formerly The Dent Atlas of the Holocaust; 1982, 1993.
 
 
 
 

 

  Preview in ProQuest.
 
 
 

Further reading
 Bernadac, Christian (ed.) (1980). L'Holocauste oublié. Le martyre des Tsiganes Éditions Famot (in French).
 Fonseca, Isabel (1996). Bury Me Standing: The Gypsies And Their Journey. Chapter 7, The Devouring. London: Vintage. .
 Kenrick, Donald; Puxon, Grattan (2009). Gypsies Under the Swastika. Univ of Hertfordshire Press. .
 Klamper, Elisabeth (1993). Persecution and Annihilation of Roma and Sinti in Austria, 1938–1945. Journal of the Gypsy Lore Society 5, 3 (2).
 
  In Google Books.
 Montemarano, Mike (22 April 2015). A Case for Heritage: The Romani. Art on the Banks Journal.
 Pamieci, Ksiega (1993). Memorial Book: The Gypsies at Auschwitz-Birkenau. Introduction by Jan Parcer. K G Saur Verlag for State Museum of Auschwitz-Birkenau. .
 
 Ramati, Alexander (1986). And the Violins Stopped Playing: A Story of the Gypsy Holocaust. War time biography of Roman (Dymitr) Mirga, on which the film of the same name is based.
 
 Sonneman, Toby (2002). Shared Sorrows: A Gypsy Family Remembers the Holocaust. Hatfield: University of Hertfordshire Press. .
 Tyrnauer, Gabrielle (1989). Gypsies and the Holocaust: A Bibliography and Introductory Essay. Concordia University – Montreal Institute for Genocide Studies.
 Winter, Walter (2004). Winter Time: Memoirs of a German Sinto who survived Auschwitz (Translated and annotated by Struan Robertson). Hatfield: University of Hertfordshire Press .

External links 
 Digital exhibition: "Racial Diagnosis: Gypsy". The Nazi genocide of the Sinti and Roma and the long struggle for recognition
 Historical Amnesia: The Romani Holocaust—Desicritics
 Extensive online resource on the Holocaust of the Romanies from Holocaust Survivors and Remembrance Project: "Forget You Not"
 Non-Jewish Victims of Persecution in Germany—About the Holocaust, Yad Vashem
 Histories, Narratives and Documents of the Roma and Sinti (Gypsies), Center for Holocaust and Genocide Studies, University of Minnesota
 Documentation and Cultural Centre of German Sinti and Roma (German) (English)
 A Brief Romani Holocaust Chronology
 Roma-Sinti Genocide (Parajmos) Resources, Prevent Genocide International
 Memorial of Poraimos (Romani)
 – a project by Yahad – In Unum and Roma Dignity
 Roma and Sinti Under-Studied Victims of Nazism (Symposium Proceedings), PDF, 98 р.
 Persecution and resistance of Gypsies under Nationalsocialism (in German)
 Gypsies: A Persecuted Race
 A People Uncounted. The Untold Story of the Roma. Dir. Aaron Yeger. 2011. Film.

1935 establishments in Germany
1945 disestablishments in Germany
Romani in Germany
 
Antiziganism in Europe
Genocides in Europe
History of the Romani people during World War II
Politics of World War II
Articles containing video clips